The Norwegian Intelligence Service (NIS) or Etterretningstjenesten (E-tjenesten) is a Norwegian military intelligence agency under the Chief of Defence and the Ministry of Defence.

History
Olav Njølstad says that the "stay-behind cooperation with the US and Great Britain represented a milestone in the Norwegian intelligence services' history". Furthermore, through the stay-behind arrangement, the CIA finally conquered their mistrust of the Norwegian intelligence services. An important turning point" was the October–November 1949 secret visit to Norway by Frank Wisner and Richard Helms. The purpose of the visit was to discuss stay-behind with those with the top responsibility on the Norway's side. In 1995, the Ministry of Defence confirmed that the intelligence service had operated a stay-behind service in cooperation with the CIA and MI6 since the end of World War II.

The two ravens on the coat of arms represent Huginn and Muninn ("Thought" and "Mind", the two ravens that bring information to the Norse god Odin.  The red flower is thought to be either an Olaf's Rose or a sub rosa reference, perhaps both.  The Olaf rose is a national symbol of Norway and sub rosa is a Latin term referring to confidentiality and secrecy.

2013 inspections
On 12 August 2013 the first ever unannounced inspection by  Parliament's Intelligence Oversight Committee, was performed at the NIS headquarter at Lutvann in Oslo. This inspection came to be as a result of "a complaint from one or more persons" "who felt they were under surveillance".

On 27 August 2013, the Parliament's Intelligence Oversight Committee (the EOS Committee) made an unannounced inspection of the Intelligence Service's facilities at Havnelageret in Oslo. On 29 August 2013 Dagbladet said that according to their sources the Intelligence Service had stored personal information about more than 400 Norwegians—including diplomats and bureaucrats—who either were sources for the intelligence service or people the service wanted to recruit as future sources.

The inspection at Havnelageret was followed up by an announced inspection on 4 September 2013.

Organization
The service has operated, or still operates, the following stations, all of them located north of the Arctic Circle:
 Andøya (Nordland county): former SOSUS station, suspected ACINT station
 Fauske (Nordland county): suspected FISINT (TELINT) and ELINT station
 Kirkenes (Finnmark county): suspected ELINT and NUCINT station
 Vardø (Finnmark county): the GLOBUS radar, suspected ELINT station
 Vadsø (Finnmark county): SIGINT (COMINT) station
Kirkenes, Vardø, and Vadsø are close to the Russian border near Severomorsk in the Murmansk district on the Kola Peninsula, the home of the former Soviet Northern Fleet and now its Russian equivalent.

The agency uses at least one ELINT ship—F/S Marjata.

E 14 

E 14 (Norway) (Seksjon for spesiell innhenting) is/was a highly classified section within the Intelligence Service, focusing on covert missions abroad. For a period, the section was led by Ola Kaldager. Agents include the late Trond André Bolle.

Leaders
 Vice Admiral Nils Andreas Stensønes (3 November 2020–Present)
 General Morten Haga Lunde (2016–2020)
 General Kjell Grandhagen (2010–2015)
 Colonel Johan Berg (1966–?)
 Vilhelm Evang (1946–1965)

See also
 F/S Marjata
 Military of Norway

References

External links
 Norwegian Intelligence Service official homepage
 Nå vil E-tjenesten ut av mystikken [Now the E Service wants out of the mysteriousness]

http://www.dagbladet.no/nyheter/2001/04/25/254089.html

Intelligence Service
 
National Intelligence Service